Ghost Wars is a paranormal action television series created by Simon Barry. It premiered on Syfy on October 5, 2017, and concluded on January 4, 2018. Thirteen episodes were produced for the series. The series was released on Netflix in the UK on March 2, 2018. On April 21, 2018, Syfy announced that the series had been cancelled after one season.

Plot
Ghost Wars takes place in a remote Alaskan town that has been overrun by paranormal forces. The series focuses on local outcast Roman Mercer, who must overcome the town's prejudices and his own personal demons if he is to harness his repressed psychic powers and save everyone from the mass haunting that is threatening to destroy them all.

Cast and characters

Main

 Avan Jogia as Roman Mercer
 Kim Coates as Billy McGrath
 Vincent D'Onofrio as Catholic Father Dan Carpenter
 Meat Loaf as Doug Rennie
 Kandyse McClure as Dr. Landis Barker, lead scientist at the LAMBDA Institute and Billy's not-so-secret lover
 Luvia Petersen as Valerie "Val" McGrath-Dufresne, Port Moore's mayor and Billy's sister

Recurring
 Elise Gatien as Maggie Rennie, Roman's friend, now a ghost and daughter of Doug Rennie, whose death still haunts her father.
 Jesse Moss as  Deputy Norman "Norm" Waters, a deputy sheriff who is one of the first to believe in Roman's ghostly visions.
 Andrew Moxham as Paolo Jones, a  scientist at the LAMBDA Institute, who splits his time between the institute and town with his wife.
 Sonja Bennett as Karla Kowalski-Jones, the owner of the town's local watering hole, who proves to be tougher than her husband, Paolo, thinks.
 Kristin Lehman as Marilyn McGrath-Dufresne, wife of Valerie and Port Moore's doctor whose daughters' involvement with the ghosts cause her and her wife to fight to protect their family.
 Allison James as Isabel McGrath-Dufresne, the daughter of Val and Marilyn, whose connection, along with twin sister Abigail, to the ghosts scares her parents.
 Sarah Giles as Abigail McGrath-Dufresne, the daughter of Val and Marilyn, whose connection, along with her twin sister Isabel, to the ghosts scares her parents. 
 Veena Sood as Nadine Mercer, the necromancing mother of Roman, whose mysterious past still haunts her and her son.
 Sharon Taylor as Sophia Moon, the town mortician who is one of the first to believe in Roman's ghostly visions, then becomes haunted after the death of her son and fellow townspeople. 
 Kathryn Kirkpatrick as Carol (aka Bake Sale Carol), the church lady who is always willing to lend a hand to help or an ear for gossip.

Episodes

Production
Filming took place in the Vancouver area, and concluded on August 31, 2017.

References

External links

2017 American television series debuts
2018 American television series endings
2010s American drama television series
2010s American supernatural television series
English-language television shows
Lesbian-related television shows
Syfy original programming
Television shows set in Alaska